The first World Record in the 200 m for women (athletics) was recognised by the Fédération Sportive Féminine Internationale (FSFI) in 1922. The FSFI was absorbed by the International Association of Athletics Federations in 1936. However, the IAAF did not maintain a record category for 200 m (bend) as opposed to 200 m (straight) until after 1951. The IAAF eliminated the 200 m (straight) record after 1976. "y" denotes times set at 220 yards (201.17 m) which were ratified as world records.

To June 21, 2009, the IAAF (and the FSFI before it) have ratified 26 world records in the event.

Records 1922–36; 1951–76

(+) denotes en route time set during longer race

The "Time" column indicates the ratified mark; the "Wind" column indicates the wind assistance in metres per second, 2.0 m/s the current maximum allowable, a negative indicates the mark was set running into a wind; the "Auto" column indicates a fully automatic time that was also recorded in the event when hand-timed marks were used for official records, or which was the basis for the official mark, rounded to the 10th or 100th of a second, depending on the rules then in place. A "y" indicates a distance measured in yards and ratified as a world record in this event.

Records from 1977 

From 1975, the IAAF accepted separate automatically electronically timed records for events up to 400 metres. Starting January 1, 1977, the IAAF required fully automatic timing to the hundredth of a second for these events.

Irena Szewińska's 22.21 from 1974 was the fastest eligible 200 metre performance at that time.

References

200, women
200 metres